The out-of-the-loop performance problem (OOL or OOTL) arises when an operator suffers from performance decrement as a consequence of automation. The potential loss of skills and of situation awareness caused by vigilance and complacency problems might make operators of automated systems unable to operate manually in case of system failure. Highly automated systems reduce the operator to monitoring role, which diminishes the chances for the operator to understand the system. It is related to mind wandering.

Etymology

One of the first mentions of OOL came up in the context of flight automation in 1980s.

Consequences
Three Mile Island accident in 1979, USAir Flight 5050 crash in 1989, Air France Flight 447 in 2009 and the loss of $400 million by Knight Capital Group in 2012 are attributed to OOL.

Automatic train operation

Automatic train operation is meant to reduce manual operation. This results in OOL performance problem for train drivers.

See also

 Automation bias

References

Impact of Automation
Ergonomics
Cognition